Røykenvik Station was the terminal station of the Røykenvik Line. Located in Gran, Norway, it opened on 20 December 1900 as part of the North Line. The station was first called Røikenvik, but changed to the current spelling in April 1924. The station was a changeover from train to steam ship. It was eventually closed along with the Røykenvik Line.

The name
The station is named after a nearby inlet in Randsfjorden. The first element is the name of the old farm Røyken (Norse Raukvin), the last element is vik 'inlet, cove'. For the meaning of the farm name see Røyken.

External links
Entry at the Norwegian Railway Club 

Railway stations in Oppland
Railway stations on the Gjøvik Line
Railway stations opened in 1900
1900 establishments in Norway
Gran, Norway